Midoun is a town and commune located on the north east of Djerba in Medenine Governorate, Tunisia. As of 2014 it had a population of 63,528.

Midoun has 7 Imadas (districts): Midoun, Mahboubine, El-May, Arkou, Sedouikch, Robbana and Ben-Maaguel.

The commune has an electrification rate of 99% and a drinking water connection rate of 84%. The commune also has 90 hotels ranging from motels to luxurious 5-star hotels with a total capacity of 50,000 beds, making it the biggest tourist destination in Tunisia.

See also
List of cities in Tunisia

References

Populated places in Tunisia
Communes of Tunisia
Djerba
Tunisia geography articles needing translation from French Wikipedia